Carl Christian Holger Petersen is a Professor of neuroscience at the École Polytechnique Fédérale de Lausanne (EPFL) in Switzerland.

Professional Biography 
Carl Petersen obtained a BSc in physics from the University of Oxford in 1992. During his PhD studies under the supervision of Prof. Sir Michael Berridge at the University of Cambridge (1992-1996), he investigated cellular and molecular mechanisms of calcium signalling. In his first postdoctoral period (1996-1998), he joined the laboratory of Prof. Roger Nicoll at the University of California San Francisco (UCSF) to investigate synaptic transmission and plasticity in the hippocampus. During a second postdoctoral period, in the laboratory of Prof. Bert Sakmann at the Max Planck Institute for Medical Research in Heidelberg (1999-2003), he began working on the primary somatosensory barrel cortex, investigating cortical circuits and sensory processing. Carl Petersen joined the Brain Mind Institute of the School of Life Sciences at the École Polytechnique Fédérale de Lausanne (EPFL) in 2003, setting up the Laboratory of Sensory Processing to investigate the functional operation of neural circuits in awake mice during quantified behavior. In 2019, Carl Petersen became the Director of the EPFL Brain Mind Institute, with the goal to promote quantitative multidisciplinary research into neural structure, function, dysfunction, computation and therapy through technological advances.

Personal life 
Carl Petersen is the son of Ole Holger Petersen, a professor of physiology at Cardiff University.

References

External links 
 

Living people
Swiss neuroscientists
Danish neuroscientists
Academic staff of the École Polytechnique Fédérale de Lausanne
Year of birth missing (living people)